Joseph Daniel Harris (born August 17, 1951) is a mathematician at Harvard University working in the field of algebraic geometry. After earning an AB from Harvard College, where he took Math 55, he continued at Harvard to study for a PhD under Phillip Griffiths.

Work
During the 1980s, he was on the faculty of Brown University, moving to Harvard around 1988. He served as chair of the department at Harvard from 2002 to 2005.  His work is characterized by its classical geometric flavor: he has claimed that nothing he thinks about could not have been imagined by the Italian geometers of the late 19th and early 20th centuries, and that if he has had greater success than them, it is because he has access to better tools.

Harris is well known for several of his books on algebraic geometry, notable for their informal presentations:
 Principles of Algebraic Geometry , with Phillip Griffiths
 Geometry of Algebraic Curves, Vol. 1 , with Enrico Arbarello, Maurizio Cornalba, and Phillip Griffiths
 , with William Fulton
 
 , with David Eisenbud

 Moduli of Curves , with Ian Morrison.
 Fat Chance: Probability from 0 to 1, with Benedict Gross and Emily Riehl, 2019
As of 2018, Harris has supervised 50 PhD students, including Brendan Hassett, James McKernan, Rahul Pandharipande, Zvezdelina Stankova, and Ravi Vakil.

References

1951 births
Living people
20th-century American mathematicians
21st-century American mathematicians
Algebraic geometers
Brown University faculty
Central High School (Philadelphia) alumni
Harvard College alumni
Harvard University faculty
Harvard Graduate School of Arts and Sciences alumni